is a former Japanese rugby union player. He usually played on the wing, and sometimes at centre, for the Japanese national team. He made his name internationally as a speedy ace in the World Rugby Sevens Series (then known as the IRB World Sevens Series), and went on to become a regular member of the national team. He first played for Japan on November 9, 1996 and scored three tries that day. He is the leading rugby union test try scorer of all time. In November 2016, Ohata was inducted into the World Rugby Hall of Fame at the opening ceremony for the Hall's first physical location in Rugby, Warwickshire.

Life and career
Ohata was born in Osaka and speaks with a strong Kansai accent. He attended rugby nurseries Tokai Dai Gyosei High School with Koji Uehara and Yoshinori Tateyama, where the three were classmates, and Kyoto Sangyo University.

World record holder
On 14 May 2006, Ohata scored three tries for Japan against Georgia at Hanazono Stadium, in doing so claiming the world record for tries in rugby test matches. This gave him sixty-five tries for his country in fifty-five tests; he has since extended his record to sixty-nine tries from fifty-eight tests. The record was previously held by David Campese of Australia, who scored 64 tries from 101 tests. Brian Habana of South Africa eclipsed Campese's record with 67 tries (124 caps), the last one coming in 2016. However, unlike Campese and Habana, only a quarter of Ohata's tries were scored against major rugby union playing nations, causing controversy in some media.

Ohata did not take part in the Rugby World Cup 2007, as he had ruptured his left Achilles tendon in an August practice match against Portugal. He had only just returned that month to the national side, having recovered from a right Achilles tendon rupture in January.
 
In January 2011 Ohata's retirement was announced. Ohata, being 35-years-old, stated: “It's sad that it ended like this but I think I have had a good career. I feel I have left my mark as a rugby player.”

See also
 List of leading rugby union test try scorers

References

External links
 "Ohata deserves his place in the record books", Daily Yomiuri, May 16, 2006
 "Ohata sets new world mark", Daily Yomiuri, May 15, 2006
 Photo of Ohata - JRFU website
 Article on JRFU website
 

1975 births
Living people
Japanese rugby union players
Kobelco Kobe Steelers players
ASM Clermont Auvergne players
Sportspeople from Osaka
Rugby union wings
Japan international rugby union players
Asian Games medalists in rugby union
Rugby union players at the 1998 Asian Games
Rugby union players at the 2002 Asian Games
Asian Games silver medalists for Japan
Medalists at the 1998 Asian Games
Medalists at the 2002 Asian Games
World Rugby Hall of Fame inductees
Japan international rugby sevens players